Scott Township is the name of some places in the U.S. state of Pennsylvania:

Scott Township, Allegheny County, Pennsylvania
Scott Township, Columbia County, Pennsylvania
Scott Township, Lackawanna County, Pennsylvania
Scott Township, Lawrence County, Pennsylvania
Scott Township, Wayne County, Pennsylvania

Pennsylvania township disambiguation pages